This article is a collection of lists of natural (rivers, estuaries, and straits) and artificial (reservoirs, canals and locks) waterways.

Waterways lists

Natural waterways 

 List of estuaries in England
 List of straits in the United States
 List of watercourses in Western Australia
 List of watercourses in the San Francisco Bay Area

Artificial waterways

Canals 

 List of canals in Australia
 List of canals in Belgium
 List of canals in France
 List of canals in Canada
 List of canals in Germany
 List of canals in Ireland
 List of canals in Pakistan
 List of canals in Switzerland
 List of canals of the United Kingdom
 List of canals in the United States
 List of canals in Massachusetts
 List of canals in New York
 List of canals in Oregon
 List of canals in Texas
 List of Martian canals
 List of aqueducts
 List of interoceanic canals
 List of transcontinental canals

Others 

 Lists of reservoirs and dams
 List of locks and dams of the Ohio River
 List of locks and dams of the Upper Mississippi River
 List of canal locks in the United Kingdom

Organizations about waterways 
 List of navigation authorities in the United Kingdom
 List of navigation authorities in the United States
 List of waterway societies in the United Kingdom

See also 

 Sheep Creek

Lists of bodies of water
Lists of routes